Yaar Paiyyan is a 1957 Indian Tamil-language children's comedy film directed by T. R. Raghunath and written by Sridhar. A remake of the Bengali film Chheley Kaar (1954), it stars Gemini Ganesan, K. Savitri, N. S. Krishnan, T. A. Mathuram and Daisy Irani. The film revolves around the efforts of a destitute boy to find his parents. Yaar Paiyyan was released on 26 July 1957 and emerged a success.

Plot 

Poori, a young boy, does not know who his parents are, and has been looking relentlessly for them. While sitting in a park bench, Poori asks the man seated beside him his name. When the man introduces himself as Sundararajan, Poori declares that he is his father. This affects Sundararajan's life, even derailing his plans of marrying Latha, his lover. The president of a mental hospital with a mentally-imbalanced daughter creates more trouble for Sundararajan. Ultimately, the truth about Poori's parentage is revealed: he is the illegitimate son of Kumar, a soldier, and the abandoned mother committed suicide, leaving Poori destitute. Attracted to Poori, Sundararajan and Latha decide to adopt him as their own son.

Cast 
 Gemini Ganesan as Sundararajan
 K. Savitri as Latha
 N. S. Krishnan as Kandasamy Mudhaliyar
 T. A. Mathuram as Deivayaanai
 Daisy Irani as Poori
 M. K. Mustafa as Kumar
 K. Sarangapani
 T. R. Ramachandran as Sankar
 V. K. Ramasamy
 V. Nagayya
 P. S. Gnanam
 Vidhyavathi

Production 
Yaar Paiyyan, a remake of the Bengali film Chheley Kaar (1954) written by Sriyuktha Jyothirmaye Roy, was directed by T. R. Raghunath and produced by N. S. Thiraviam and T. A. Dorairajan under Vijaya Films. The screenplay was written by Sridhar, cinematography was handled by A. Vincent, editing by S. A. Murugesh, and art direction was handled by Ganga.

Soundtrack 
The music was composed by S. Dakshinamurthi and the lyrics were written by A. Maruthakasi. Dakshinamurthi composed all songs except "Thandhai Yaaro", which was composed by T. Chalapathi Rao.

Release and reception 

Yaar Paiyyan was released on 26 July 1957,  and emerged a success. Sekar and Sundar jointly reviewed the film for Ananda Vikatan, praising Irani's performance.

References

External links 
 

1950s children's comedy films
1950s Tamil-language films
1957 films
Films directed by T. R. Raghunath
Films scored by Susarla Dakshinamurthi
Films scored by T. M. Ibrahim
Indian children's comedy films
Tamil remakes of Bengali films